Union Turnpike is a thoroughfare stretching across part of Long Island in southern New York state, mostly within central and eastern Queens in New York City. It runs from Myrtle Avenue in Glendale, Queens, to Marcus Avenue in North New Hyde Park, Nassau County, about  outside New York City border. The name memorializes the Union Racetrack, once a famous attraction for Queens residents.

The turnpike crosses into Nassau County at the city's easternmost point on Langdale Street, two blocks past the city's highest-numbered street (271st Street). North of the turnpike at this point is Glen Oaks and south of it is Floral Park, both sharing the same ZIP code (11004). It then enters the hamlet of North New Hyde Park.

Description

Starting from the intersection of Myrtle Avenue, 86th Street and the Jackie Robinson Parkway's east-bound exit 5 ramps in Glendale, Union Turnpike crosses Woodhaven Boulevard. It continues as the northern boundary of Forest Park to an intersection with Metropolitan Avenue. Just east of here Union Turnpike crosses over the Jackie Robinson Parkway near Exit 6 (Metropolitan Avenue). Union Turnpike then straddles the parkway, but there is no access to or from the parkway to Union Turnpike. This section is in Kew Gardens.

Soon, Union Turnpike and the parkway go under a long tunnel. On top is Queens Boulevard (New York State Highway 25). There is a full diamond interchange with it from Union Turnpike, but no access from the parkway. Just after Queens Boulevard, the parkway ends at the Kew Gardens Interchange, connecting with the Van Wyck Expressway (Interstate 678) and the Grand Central Parkway (Exits 7 and 8 on the Jackie Robinson, Exit 13 on the Grand Central, and Exit 10 on the Van Wyck. From Union Turnpike there is partial access to the Grand Central, and none to the Van Wyck).

Union Turnpike eastbound goes on a bridge over the Grand Central Parkway to meet with Union Turnpike westbound on the other side at an intersection with the Grand Central Parkway's service roads just east of the intersection, and the road becomes a four-lane divided road. It continues through the neighborhoods within Kew Gardens Hills, where it crosses Main Street and Parsons Boulevard before passing 164th Street in Hillcrest, the western sub-neighborhood of Fresh Meadows. It then passes St. John's University, crossing Utopia Parkway, goes through Utopia, and proceeds into the broader neighborhood of Fresh Meadows when it crosses 188th Street and enters Cunningham Park at an intersection with Francis Lewis Boulevard. Just after Francis Lewis Boulevard is Oakland Gardens in the southern region of Bayside, where it shares a full diamond interchange with I-295, or the Clearview Expressway (Exit 2 on the Clearview).

It then crosses Hollis Court Boulevard before leaving the park going into the north part of the district of Jamaica. It passes through Hollis Hills in Queens Village, crossing Bell Boulevard and Springfield Boulevard. Just after Springfield Boulevard is a full interchange with the Grand Central Parkway (along the Grand Central, Exit 22 eastbound, and exit 23 westbound). After the Grand Central, Union Turnpike goes back into the neighborhood of Bayside, the eastern section of the Flushing district, where it becomes the southern boundary of Alley Pond Park until it intersects with Winchester Boulevard. It then passes the Creedmoor Psychiatric Center, and then shares a full interchange with the Cross Island Parkway (Exit 28B on the Cross Island).

Past here, Union Turnpike crosses Commonwealth Boulevard just after the Cross Island Parkway interchange before passing over Little Neck Parkway into Bellerose, then it passes through the neighborhood of Glen Oaks. It crosses the highest-numbered street in New York City, 271st Street, and then passes the city's easternmost point, at Langdale Street. Just past here, Union Turnpike enters Nassau County, where it intersects with Lakeville Road. It passes a shopping center in Lake Success, crosses New Hyde Park Road, and ends a block east at Marcus Avenue.

Character
With the exception of a section in Glendale, most of Union Turnpike consists of four traffic lanes divided by a narrow concrete median. The Glendale section contains a wide mall with trees, and in Kew Gardens, the turnpike flanks the Jackie Robinson Parkway crossing over the Main Line of the Long Island Rail Road, before dipping below Queens Boulevard. Though it appears to be a service road for the parkway, it does not function as such. There is no direct access to the parkway, though there is partial access to the Grand Central Parkway. This section has its own full diamond interchange with Queens Boulevard.

Former route designation
The section of Union Turnpike between Queens Boulevard and Marcus Avenue was New York State Route 25C from the mid-1930s to 1970.

Transportation

Between Queens Boulevard in Kew Gardens and the city line, the Q46 bus line travels along Union Turnpike. The Union Turnpike express buses, comprising eight routes, also run along this section. The Q23 and QM12 terminate on Union Turnpike just east of Woodhaven Boulevard in Glendale.

Points of interest
Among the landmarks found along the turnpike are Forest Park, Queens Borough Hall, St. John's University, and Creedmoor Psychiatric Center.

History

Union Turnpike was originally a dirt road, initially designed as a toll road. At the time, Union Turnpike traveled through relatively undeveloped areas, serving as a border between the towns of Flushing and Jamaica. It started at Metropolitan Avenue in Forest Hills and ended at Utopia Parkway near Jamaica. 

Prior to the construction of Grand Central Parkway and Interboro Parkway (now the Jackie Robinson Parkway) in the 1930s, Union Turnpike was heavily used, and developed businesses throughout its length. In 1929, there was a proposal to make improvements to four existing roads in order to make them major thoroughfares between Queens and Nassau, namely Astoria Boulevard, Northern Boulevard, Nassau Boulevard, and Union Turnpike. Civic associations in Jamaica opposed the Union Turnpike proposal, and they convinced Queens Borough President George Harvey. Nevertheless, the section of Union Turnpike from Kew Gardens to the Nassau County line was converted from a narrow unpaved road to a paved multi-lane highway in the late 1930s, in advance of the 1939 New York World's Fair. Around the same time, the turnpike was depressed below Queens Boulevard in conjunction with the construction of the Queens Boulevard Subway, and extended eastward from Fresh Meadows towards Marcus Avenue in Nassau County.

Prior to 1970, the section of Union Turnpike to the east of Queens Boulevard was designated as New York State Route 25C. Since then, only the section of Union Turnpike within Nassau County still carries this numerical designation.

Major intersections

References

External links

NY 25C; Union Turnpike (Greater New York Roads)

Streets in Queens, New York